Aloysius "Lucky" Gordon (5 July 1931 – 15 March 2017) was a British-based Jamaican jazz singer who came to public attention during the Profumo affair. He arrived in Scotland from Jamaica in 1948, and moved to London after a few days.

Early years
Aloysius "Lucky" Gordon was born in Kingston, Jamaica, and stowed away to Britain in 1947, according to his account to the Jamaica Observer in a 1998 interview.

Profumo affair
Joining his brother "Psycho" Gordon on the London jazz scene, Lucky Gordon became involved with nightclub hostess Christine Keeler, a relationship that ended acrimoniously, although Keeler disputed that there was ever a relationship between them. According to Keeler, he raped her at knifepoint at his flat in St Stephen's Square, assaulted her in the street and held her hostage for two days. Keeler sought the protection of her lover, Johnny Edgecombe, which culminated in a public fight between Edgecombe and Gordon at the Flamingo Club in Wardour Street in October 1962. Gordon required 17 stitches after Edgecombe slit his face with a knife. He later posted the 17 used stitches to Keeler and warned her that for each stitch he had sent she would get two on her face in return.

Edgecombe's frustrations in seeking protection from Keeler following this fight led to him firing gunshots outside Stephen Ward's flat in December 1962 that in turn set in motion a chain of events that would eventually result in the public revelations of the Profumo affair.

In June 1963, Gordon was jailed for three years for assaulting Keeler, but she subsequently withdrew her accusations, and was convicted of perjury in December 1963.

Musical career
Gordon later worked as a cook at Island Records' Basing Street Studios near Ladbroke Grove, his employers including Bob Marley. After the studio changed ownership to become Sarm West Studios in the mid-1980s, Gordon contributed "skank" vocals to a cover version of "Heaven Knows I'm Miserable Now" by pop duo Act (under the name of "Casbah"), and a rare vocal mix  of the Art of Noise's "Moments in Love", both for ZTT Records.

Gordon died on 15 March 2017, aged 85.

Cultural references
In the 1989 film Scandal about the Profumo affair, Gordon was portrayed by Leon Herbert.
Gordon was portrayed by Ricardo Coke Thomas in Andrew Lloyd Webber's stage musical Stephen Ward the Musical, which opened at the Aldwych Theatre on 19 December 2013.
Anthony Welsh acts the part of Lucky Gordon in the BBC series The Trial of Christine Keeler.
In 2020 Emily Capell and Dreadzone released "Flamingo", a musical retelling of the story.

References

External links
 The Profumo Affair - a summary
 Where Are They Now? Christine Keeler and the Profumo Affair

1931 births
2017 deaths
People from Kingston, Jamaica
Jamaican jazz musicians
Migrants from British Jamaica to the United Kingdom
Jamaican male musicians